Carryduff is a small town and townland in County Down, Northern Ireland, about  south of Belfast city centre. It had a population of 6,961 people in the 2011 Census.

Most of the settlement lies within the townland of Carryduff, although part of it extends into the neighbouring townlands of Killynure and Mealough.

History
One of the earliest references to the settlement dates from 1622, where its anglicised name is written as Carrow-Hugh-Duffe. The original village formed where six roads and a river crossed, and is the site of the ancient Queen's Fort Rath. The road south from Belfast (the A24) climbs out of a gap in the Castlereagh Hills, and splits at Carryduff, one fork (the A7) continuing to Downpatrick (via Saintfield and Crossgar), the other fork (A24) continuing via Ballynahinch to Newcastle towards Kilkeel. In addition, the road from the Ards Peninsula, Newtownards and Comber (the B178) crosses here en route to Hillsborough in the west. All six roads cross the small Carryduff River here (which flows northwards to eventually join the River Lagan at Minnowburn).

The Knockbracken Reservoir was constructed for the Belfast Water Commissioners and opened in 1901, the same year as the Mourne Conduit which carried water from the Kilkeel and Annalong rivers (and later the Silent Valley Reservoir) to Carryduff where it was transported on to Belfast. The Mourne Conduit was replaced by the Aquarius pipeline and associated infrastructure between 1999 and 2004. This new pipeline was laid to the east and north of Carryduff, crossing the A24 at Brackenvale, and bypassing the Knockbracken Reservoir.

The good road connections and proximity to Belfast made the town an ideal site for overspill development from the city in the 1960s. This period saw numerous housing developments, the construction of the Town and Country Shopping Centre, and Carryduff Primary School, leading into the 1970s with the building of the Killynure housing estate by the Northern Ireland Housing Executive. Development along one side of the northbound A24 took place adjacent to the Immaculate Heart of Mary Roman Catholic Church and St Joseph's Primary School, with the Knockbracken Reservoir on the other side.

The 1980s saw expansion continue with Carryduff becoming a commuter town for Belfast workers. Developments continued into the 1990s and included Carryduff Library, Carryduff Shopping Centre, including shops such as Wellworths (later SuperValu) and stationery and book shop NPO (later Eason). Numerous further housing developments have been built, as well as the Lough Moss Leisure Centre. These developments saw the Carryduff River placed inside a culvert for much of its journey through the town.

Very little green belt land now remains between Carryduff and the southern border of Belfast, the 1980s having seen the former Matthew Stop Line breached. 

In 2018, the disused Knockbracken reservoir has become Ireland's largest aqua park, offering a range of water based activities.

Demography

2011 Census 
The population of Carryduff on Census day (27 March 2011) was 6,961 people. Of this:

 21.45% were aged under 16 years and 13.92% were aged 65 years and over
 The mean age was 38 years
 47.55% of the population were male and 52.45% were female
 96.83% were from the white (including Irish Traveller) ethnic group
 49.85% were from a Catholic background and 42.24% were from a Protestant or Other Christian (including Christian related) background
 49.39% indicated they had a British national identity, 28.96% indicated they had an Irish national identity, and 32.45% indicated they had a Northern Irish national identity*
*respondents could indicate more than one nationality.

Language 

 10.68% had knowledge of Irish
 5.74% had knowledge of Ulster-Scots
 2.23% did not have English as their first language

Sport and clubs

Gaelic games
Carryduff is home to Carryduff GAC. It was in 1971 that a group of parents, concerned at the lack of playing facilities in the fast growing southern suburb of Belfast, came together to form a schoolboys Gaelic Football team. The prime movers in the club were Harry McEvoy, Paddy McEvoy and Martin McAteer, and within a couple of years a full G.A.A. club had come into being with a team entered in the East Down League.  The club wears purple and yellow jerseys with black shorts. Carryduff has had many county players over the years with Greg Blaney, Neil Collins, Mark McCartan and John Kelly featured prominently in Down’s All-Ireland accomplishments in the Nineties.

Association football
Carryduff also has 2 local men's football teams who all play from Lough Moss pitches in the town, they are Carryduff Colts F.C. and Carryduff Athletic F.C.

Canoe Polo

Since the development of Lets Go Hydro. Belfast Kayak Academy/Ulster Canoe-Polo have been based at the reservoir in Carryduff. They compete across Ireland, UK and have also competed across Europe.  International competitions have been held here. Teams from across Europe and as far as South Africa and New Zealand have played here.

See also
List of localities in Northern Ireland by population

References

Towns in County Down
Civil parish of Drumbo